Kimba is a rural service town on the Eyre Highway at the top of Eyre Peninsula in the Australian state of South Australia. The Gawler Ranges are north of the highway near the town.

Kimba is located in the federal division of Grey, the state electoral district of Giles and the local government area of the District Council of Kimba.

The word "kimba" is derived from the local Aboriginal word for "bushfire", and the District Council of Kimba's emblem reflects this in the form of a burning bush. The town was built on Barngarla lands.

Early history 
The first European in the area was explorer Edward John Eyre, who passed through the area on his passage from Streaky Bay to the head of Spencer Gulf in late 1839.

The area was first settled in the 1870s by lease-holding pastoralists who moved north up the Eyre Peninsula during the 1870s and 1880s. They lightly stocked the land and relied on the limited water supplies and intermittent open grass lands to raise their stock. It was more intensively settled for wheat farming from 1908, when overseas demand for wheat increased in the late nineteenth and early twentieth centuries. The large tracts of mallee scrub began to be cleared to facilitate this, and soon regular mail services were established from the port at Cowell. Bags of wheat had to be loaded onto bullock drays which carried the produce to Cowell 76 km south.

In 1913, Kimba was connected by narrow gauge railway to Port Lincoln. This development encouraged a number of new wheat farmers to move into the area. Two years later the township of Kimba was officially proclaimed and service industries began to move into the district.

Education within the town is provided by the Kimba Area School where around 170 students from reception to year 12 attend.

National Radioactive Waste Management Facility 
Two properties in the Kimba district were nominated in 2017 for a proposed National Radioactive Waste Management Facility, to store low-level and intermediate-level nuclear waste. One is owned by Brett and Michelle Rayner, and the other is owned by Andrew and Dale Baldock. A third proposed site was located at Barndioota in the Flinders Ranges.

In 2017, a Kimba town vote demonstrated support for further investigation of the prospect. The result of the vote was 396 to 294 in favour. Opposition to the project has been expressed by community groups No Radioactive Waste on Agricultural Land in Kimba or SA and the Against Radioactive Waste Action Group.

The facility would also temporarily store intermediate-level waste from Lucas Heights nuclear reactor, until a suitable permanent site was found.

The federal government is allocating a  community development package to boost the skills of local businesses and workers to build and run the dump. The facility would cost , and create 45 jobs during construction and 25 ongoing jobs.

Culture 
Kimba is situated on the traditional lands of the Barngarla people.

An  large-scale public artwork known as "The Big Galah" welcomes visitors to Kimba as they enter the township. The Kimba Art Prize is held annually by the District Council of Kimba. Selected works are displayed in the Kimba Institute in September, and an award is presented to a local artist. In 2017, the art prize received 150 entries from around South Australia and interstate.

Climate

Kimba experiences a cold semi-arid climate  bordering on a hot-summer mediterranean climate (Köppen: BSk/Csa, Trewartha: BSal/Csal);  with warm to hot, dry summers; mild to warm dry springs and autumns; and mild, relatively dry winters.
Kimba is located within a dry (arid and semi arid) climate zone, where precipitation is less than the total potential evapotranspiration. The region is characterised by hot summers and relies on cool winter rainfall for cereal (dominantly wheat and barley with smaller amounts of oats and canola) agriculture. Grazing is also practised, largely that of merino sheep for wool production with smaller amounts of cattle grazing. Water for stock is sourced solely from rainfall due to the paucity of reliable groundwater in the district, and often summer thunderstorms can supplement the winter rainfall for grazing purposes.

Kimba and the associated Buckleboo agricultural area is one of a small number of communities on Eyre Peninsula located significantly to the north of Goyders Line in South Australia. This line represents a remarkable development in climatic understanding from the 19th century in that it was the first recognition of the vagaries of highly variable rainfall and climatic conditions with respect to European style agriculture.

Soils and geomorphology

The Kimba district is dominated by calcareous earths, containing distinctive calcrete profiles and varying degrees of development, with minor ferruginous red-brown earths and local pisolitic regions. The major exception is to the south west of the Kimba District, within the Corrobinnie Depression, a palaeochannel which is now filled with deep sands. Much of this region is unsuitable for agriculture and comprises the Pinkawillinie Conservation Park. Locally grey loams and gypsum bearing flats are developed, with minor evaporites surrounding playa lakes, such as Lake Gilles at the eastern end of the district.

Small rounded hills in the form of Wild Dog Hill occur in the Kelly region to the east of Kimba township, with two ranges, Botanella Hills and the Wilcherry Range comprising uplands to the north east. The Gawler Ranges located in the pastoral country to the far north, the Cleve Uplands to the south, and the Corrobinnie Depression comprise distinct geomorphic boundaries to the District Council of Kimba.

Notable persons from Kimba

Parliamentarians

 Arthur Whyte; Member and Leader of the South Australian Legislative Council (1966–1985; Leader from 1978 to 1985)
 Barry Wakelin; Federal member for Grey (1993–2007)
 Caroline Schaefer; Member of the South Australian Legislative Council (1993–2010)
 Rowan Ramsey; Federal member for Grey (2007–present)

AFL footballers
 Robert Schaefer, Richmond, (1993; 11 games)
 Shane Wakelin, St Kilda (1994–2000; 94 games), Collingwood (2001–2008; 158 games), 252 total
 Darryl Wakelin, St Kilda (1995–2000; 115 games), Port Adelaide (2001–2007; 146 games), 261 total
 Corey Enright, Geelong (2001–2016 ; 332 games), 6x All Australian (2008–2011, 2013,2016), 3x Premiership player (2007, 2009, 2011).

See also
Kimba (disambiguation)

References

Towns in South Australia
Eyre Peninsula